Akbet is a mountain in Bayanaul District, Pavlodar Region, Kazakhstan.

According to local folklore, the mountain is named after a Kazakh girl who killed herself there after having been given in marriage to a man she did not love.

Geography 
Akbet rises in the Bayanaul Range, a subrange of the Kazakh Uplands (Saryarka). The mountain has generally gentle slopes, but rocky and strongly dissected on the western side, where there is a gorge with springs. 
With an elevation , it is the highest mountain in the Bayanaul Range, as well as the highest point of Pavlodar Region.

Geologically the peak is made up of Silurian and Devonian granite, syenite, porphyry and shale.

See also
Geography of Kazakhstan

References

External links
 Mountain Akbet in Bayanaul

Kazakh Uplands
Mountains of Kazakhstan